Alessandro de Minicis (born 4 August 1963) is a former professional tennis player from Italy.

Career
De Minicis was a quarter-finalist at Båstad in 1985 and finished runner-up at the Florence Open in 1987.

As a doubles player he reached two finals, both in Saint-Vincent, but was beaten on each occasion.

The Italian never competed in the main draw of a Grand Slam tournament.

Grand Prix career finals

Singles: 1 (0–1)

Doubles: 2 (0–2)

Challenger titles

Doubles: (3)

References

External links
 
 

1963 births
Living people
Italian male tennis players
Sportspeople from Cagliari